The 1886 Scottish Cup Final was the 13th final of the Scottish Cup and the final of the 1885–86 Scottish Cup, the most prestigious knockout football competition in Scotland. The match was played at Cathkin Park in Crosshill (today part of Glasgow) on 13 February 1886 and was watched by a crowd of "between 7,000 and 8,000", "between 8,000 and 9,000",, "not less than 9,000", or 10,000 spectators.  The final was contested by defending champions Renton and seven-time winners Queen's Park.

This was the first Scottish Cup final since 1880 to be decided without the need for a replay (excluding the 1884 final which went unplayed).

Background
Queen's Park had reached the final on seven previous occasions and had gone on to win the competition on each occasion. This was the fifth time in seven seasons which Queen's Park had reached the final.

Defending champions Renton had only previously reached the final twice before, lifting the trophy in 1885, 10 years after they finished as runners-up.

Renton and Queen's Park had played twice before in the Scottish Cup, although they hadn't been drawn together for over a decade. Renton hadn't scored a goal against Queen's Park before the 1886 final with the Glasgow side winning 3–0 in the 1875 final and 2–0 in the 1874 semi-finals.

Route to the final

Queen's Park

Renton

Report
The first quarter of the game was played in heavy rain. Queen's Park, who had the benefit of a wind behind them in the first half, took the lead early on when Somerville turned home a Hamilton shot that had been blocked by Hannah. Renton came close to an equalizer shortly before half-time when Gillespie caught a shot from McCall and was nearly driven over the line in the resulting maul.

A quarter of an hour into the second half, following Renton pressure, Kelso drove a free-kick through a crowd of players to make the score 1-1; as direct free-kicks did not exist, Queen's Park protested the goal, but the referee deemed that there had been a touch on the way through. A short while afterwards, Christie injured his foot, and was a passenger for the rest of the match, having to leave the pitch for a while; Renton pressed home with a man advantage, but could not score, and, following a break after 70 minutes, Harrower scored from a Hamilton cross. Near the end Queen's Park made it three from a 'scrimmage', which was credited to Somerville, after a move involving Hamilton and Harrower.

Match details

Aftermath
Renton gained a measure of revenge at the end of the season, beating Queen's Park 5–2 in the semi-final of the Glasgow Charity Cup, a prestige tournament for four invited clubs; Renton beat local rivals Vale of Leven in the final.

Notes

References

External links
London Hearts Scottish Football Reports 13 February 1886

Scottish Cup Finals
Scottish Cup Final 1886
Scottish Cup Final 1886
Cup
19th century in Glasgow
February 1886 sports events